Mount Dalmeny is a peak  high,  east-southeast of Drabek Peak and  west of Redmond Bluff in the Anare Mountains of Victoria Land, Antarctica. The topographical feature was first discovered in 1841 by Captain James Clark Ross, Royal Navy, who named it for Archibald Primrose, Lord Dalmeny, then a junior lord of the Admiralty. The mountain lies situated on the Pennell Coast, a portion of Antarctica lying between Cape Williams and Cape Adare.

References 

Mountains of Victoria Land
Pennell Coast